Rosa Mundi may refer to:

 Rosa Mundi (album), a 2001 album by June Tabor
 Rosa Mundi (group), a short-lived musical group from 1999
 a striped rose, a cultivar of Rosa gallica

See also
Rosamund, a girl's name